Percious Boah is a Ghanaian professional footballer who plays as a forward. He previously played for Ghana Premier league side Dreams FC

Career
He scored a brace in a Ghana Premier League match against Ebusua Dwarfs which ended in a 2–0 victory for Dreams FC. 

On 12 August 2021, Boah joined Tunisian giants Espérance de Tunis on a four-year deal.

References

External links
 
 

Living people
Association football forwards
Dreams F.C. (Ghana) players
Ghanaian footballers
Ghana Premier League players
Ghana youth international footballers
Espérance Sportive de Tunis players
CS Hammam-Lif players
2002 births